Old Slaughter's Coffee House was a coffee house in St Martin's Lane in London. Opened in 1692 by Thomas Slaughter, it was the haunt of many of the important personages of the period. The building was demolished in 1843 when Cranbourn Street was constructed.

History
It was opened in 1692 by Thomas Slaughter and so was first known as Slaughter's or The Coffee-house on the Pavement, as not all London streets were paved at that time.  It was at numbers 74–75; however, around 1760, after the original landlord had died, a rival New Slaughter's opened at number 82, and the first establishment then became known as Old Slaughter's.

It was patronised by players of games including chess, draughts and whist.  Notable players included Abraham de Moivre, Benjamin Franklin and Philidor.   It was also popular with artists of all kinds – architects, painters, poets, sculptors, etc.  This artistic community included Dryden, Gainsborough, Hogarth, and Roubiliac.  Foreigners such as Frenchmen were often there, and Boswell reports Dr Johnson's comment on this around 1780:

Henry Fielding was a regular and nicknamed the head-waiter "Sock".   Sock was said to be the out-of-wedlock son of a popular comedian, James Spiller, and had a similar talent for droll wit.  On one occasion, he partook of a customer's punch while bringing it and excused this by saying that he had spilled it.  Thereafter, Sock was also known as the "Punch Spiller".

It was used as a meeting house, and the Society for the Prevention of Cruelty to Animals, which subsequently became the RSPCA, was founded there in 1824.  The meeting was organised by the Reverend Arthur Broome and chaired by Sir Fowell Buxton.  There were eight other gentlemen attending, including "Humanity Dick" – aka Colonel Richard Martin – who had successfully campaigned for the Cruel Treatment of Cattle Act in 1822 but whose latest bill for the Prevention of Cruelty to Animals had been defeated in the Lords that day.  Other MPs attending included Sir James Mackintosh and William Wilberforce.

The premises were demolished in the winter of 1843 when Cranbourn Street was constructed.

See also
 English coffeehouses in the 17th and 18th centuries

References

Citations

Sources
 
 
 
 
 
 
 
 
 
 

1692 establishments in England
Buildings and structures demolished in 1843
Coffeehouses and cafés in London
Demolished buildings and structures in London
Former buildings and structures in the City of Westminster
Restaurants established in the 17th century
Companies established in 1692